Àlex Corretja was the defending champion, but lost in the second round this year.

Nicolás Lapentti won the title, defeating Lleyton Hewitt, 6–3, 6–2 in the final.

Seeds

Draw

Finals

Top half

Section 1

Section 2

Section 3

Section 4

References

External links
 Main Draw

1999 ATP Tour